Simon Peak is located on the border of Alberta and British Columbia, at the Southern end of Mount Robson Provincial Park. It is the highest peak of Mount Fraser. It was named in 1920 by the Alberta-British Columbia Boundary Commission.

See also
 List of peaks on the British Columbia–Alberta border
 List of mountains in the Canadian Rockies

References

Three-thousanders of Alberta
Three-thousanders of British Columbia
Canadian Rockies
Mountains of Jasper National Park
Mount Robson Provincial Park